The 1996 Legg Mason Tennis Classic was a men's tennis tournament played on outdoor hard courts at the William H.G. FitzGerald Tennis Center in Washington, D.C. in the United States and was part of the Championship Series of the 1996 ATP Tour. It was the 28th edition of the tournament and was held from July 15 through July 21, 1996. Second-seeded Michael Chang won the singles title.

Finals

Singles

 Michael Chang defeated  Wayne Ferreira 6–2, 6–4
 It was Chang's 2nd title of the year and the 25th of his career.

Doubles

 Grant Connell /  Scott Davis defeated  Doug Flach /  Chris Woodruff 7–6, 3–6, 6–3
 It was Connell's 4th title of the year and the 21st of his career. It was Davis' only title of the year and the 25th of his career.

References

External links
 Official website
 ATP tournament profile

Legg Mason Tennis Classic
Washington Open (tennis)
1996 in sports in Washington, D.C.
1996 in American tennis